Agil Munawar (born 9 April 1996) is an Indonesian professional footballer who plays as a full-back for Liga 1 club Persik Kediri.

Club career

PS TNI
In 2017, Agil Munawar signed a contract with Indonesian Liga 1 club PS TNI. He made his league debut on 22 April 2017 in a match against Persib Bandung at the Pakansari Stadium, Cibinong.

Arema FC
He was signed for Arema to play in the Liga 1 in the 2018 season. Munawar made his debut on 13 September 2018 in a match against Persib Bandung at the Gelora Bandung Lautan Api Stadium, Bandung.

Persik Kediri
In 2021, Agil Munawar signed a contract with Indonesian Liga 1 club Persik Kediri. He made his league debut on 21 October 2021 in a match against Persipura Jayapura at the Moch. Soebroto Stadium, Magelang.

Career statistics

Club

Honours

Club
Arema
 Indonesia President's Cup: 2019

References

External links
 Agil Munawar Soccerway
 Agil Munawar Liga Indonesia

1996 births
Living people
Indonesian footballers
People from Bandung
Sportspeople from Bandung
Sportspeople from West Java
Liga 1 (Indonesia) players
PS TIRA players
Arema F.C. players
Persik Kediri players
Association football defenders